Wingstar may refer to:

 Wingstar (women's professional ice hockey team) former name (1998-2003) of the Montreal Axion
 Wingstar (superhero) a fictional character created in 2015, from the Indian comic Tinkle, the superhero alterego of Mapui 
 Wingstar (dragon) a fictional character from The Immortals novel series by Tamora Pierce, see List of dragons in literature
 Wingstar (video game), a 1996 videogame from Interactivision, see Index of DOS games (W)

See also

 Star (disambiguation)
 Starwing (disambiguation)
 Wing (disambiguation)